Brewood Priory may refer to:

 Black Ladies Priory, a Benedictine priory in Brewood, Staffordshire, England
 White Ladies Priory, also known as Priory of St Leonard at Brewood, in Shropshire, England